Federica Cudia (born 16 December 1989) is a former Italian para table tennis player who competed at international level events. She is a silver medalist at the 2008 Summer Paralympics and the 2010 World Championships where she competed along with Michela Brunelli, Pamela Pezzutto and Clara Podda, she is also a three-time European team medalist.

References

External links
 

1989 births
Living people
Paralympic table tennis players of Italy
Table tennis players at the 2008 Summer Paralympics
Medalists at the 2008 Summer Paralympics
Italian female table tennis players